Zaanen is a surname. Notable people with the surname include:

Adriaan Cornelis Zaanen (1913–2003), Dutch mathematician
Herman Zaanen (born 1948), Dutch rower
Jan Zaanen (born 1957), Dutch physicist

See also
Rowin van Zaanen (born 1984), Dutch footballer